Bruce Edward Nelson (born May 12, 1979) is a former American football guard and center of the National Football League.

Biography
Nelson was born in Emmetsburg, Iowa, and attended the University of Iowa. He played college football at Iowa. Nelson was 1st team All-American and 1st team All-Big Ten in his senior season in 2002. He was also team captain 2002 and also had

He was drafted by the Carolina Panthers in the second round of the 2003 NFL Draft. His NFL career was limited to two seasons because of hip injuries.

Nelson now resides in his hometown of Emmetsburg, Iowa. He also went to Emmetsburg High School as a high ranked academic athlete. He now helps with Emmetsburg's varsity football team by spending time with them throughout training and 2-a-days. He comes to practice every Tuesday and comes to help on the sidelines as an assistant coach every game.

References

External links
databaseFootball.com: Bruce Nelson

1979 births
Living people
People from Emmetsburg, Iowa
American football centers
American football offensive guards
Iowa Hawkeyes football players
Carolina Panthers players